Rosa Guerra (1834August 18, 1864) was an Argentine educator, journalist and writer. She was a pioneering woman in Argentine literature.

Biography
Rosa Guerra was born in Buenos Aires, 1834. She founded two newspapers, La Camelia, dedicated to spreading ideas associated with equality between the sexes, and La Educación a religious, poetic and literary newspaper. She also affiliated with the newspapers La Nación Argentina, El Nacional, and La Tribuna. She published the novel Lucía Miranda on the subject of the captive; La Camelia; and a drama in verse, Clemencia. Posthumously, her book of poems, Desahogos del corazón (Relief from the heart), was published. She died August 18, 1864.

La Camellia
Guerra begins her career as a journalist when Juan Manuel de Rosas was removed from power.

La Camelia began publication on April 11, 1852, and printed its last issue on May 11, 1852, printing fourteen editions. The critic Néstor Tomás Auza states, however, that there were actually 31 issues. 
 The newspaper was written mostly by women, and was financed by subscription. At first, Guerra denied her participation in the project, but later, she acknowledged being its founder. The newspaper had the slogan "Freedom! No license; equality between the two sections" It was one of the first newspapers to openly raise the need for women to have access to education.

Lucia Miranda
The novel Lucía Miranda deals with the subject of a captive, a myth that appeared for the first time recounted by Ruy Díaz de Guzmán, and that was also addressed by Eduarda Mansilla in her homonymous novel. The war novel tells the story of Lucía Miranda, the wife of a Spaniard who accompanies Sebastián Gaboto on his expedition through the Río de la Plata and is captured by the Amerindians in the destruction of Fort Sancti Spiritus. The novel presents a model of a Christian, submissive and faithful woman.

References

1834 births
1864 deaths
Writers from Buenos Aires
Argentine newspaper founders
Women founders
Argentine novelists
Argentine women novelists
19th-century Argentine writers
19th-century Argentine women writers
19th-century Argentine educators
Argentine women educators
Argentine journalists
Argentine women journalists
19th-century Argentine poets
Argentine women poets